Harry Hartley may refer to:

 Harold Hartley (politician) (1875–1958), engineer-fitter and member of the Queensland Legislative Assembly
 Harry J. Hartley (born 1938), American educator and academic administrator